Caralluma is a genus of flowering plants in the family Apocynaceae, consisting of about 120 species. 

In 1795 William Roxburgh published the name Stapelia adscendens for a plant found in India. He commented that the name for the plant in the Telugu language was Car-allum and that the succulent branches are edible raw, though bitter and salty. The name Caralluma was coined by Robert Brown for a new genus in an article published in 1811. At the time he only described one species in the genus, the plant that he renamed Caralluma adscendens. 

In 1996 Helmut Genaust published the suggestion that it was sensible to conclude that the generic name is derived from the Arabic phrase qahr al-luhum, meaning "wound in the flesh" or "abscess," referring to the floral odour. Genaust was unaware that the genus Caralluma existed east of Palestine. He specifically ruled out its existence in India, where it was first described and named. Genaust presumed that the name would have first been applied to Caralluma europaea in North Africa.

Most of the species occur in Africa, including several taxa valued by people for their medicinal properties.

Selected species
 Caralluma adscendens (also called Caralluma fimbriata) (Roxb.) R.Br.
 Caralluma burchardii N.E.Br.
 Caralluma crenulata Wall.
 Caralluma dummeri
 Caralluma edulis (Edgew.) Benth. ex Hook.f.
 Caralluma europaea (Guss.)
 Caralluma joannis Maire
 Caralluma russeliana (Courbai ex Brongn.) Cufod.
 Caralluma socotrana
 Caralluma somalica N.E.Br.
 Caralluma speciosa (N.E.Br.) N.E.Br.

Formerly placed here
Frerea indica Dalzell (as C. frerei G.D.Rowley)

References

External links

 International Plant Names Index

Asclepiadoideae
Apocynaceae genera
Taxa named by Robert Brown (botanist, born 1773)